Connecticut lost one seat in reapportionment following the 1820 United States Census.

See also 
 1822 and 1823 United States House of Representatives elections
 List of United States representatives from Connecticut

1823
Connecticut
United States House of Representatives